Sugar Creek Christian Academy is a private Christian high school in Ironton, Ohio.

External links
 School Website

Baptist schools in the United States
Christian schools in Ohio
High schools in Lawrence County, Ohio
Private high schools in Ohio